P.E.S. Institute of Technology and Management is an engineering and management college located in Shivamogga, Karnataka, India. It is affiliated to the Visvesvaraya Technological University, Belgaum.

About
PESITM is currently offering a multitude of courses in engineering and management. Shivamogga established in 2007.

The institute  provides support to research and development activities, and is presently offering-
Six BE courses
One MBA programme
Ph.D. research centres
M.Tech programmes in digital electronics and computer science & engineering.

Certification

PESITM is an ISO 9001:2015 certified institute

1.Quality Management System of PES Institute of Technology & Management, Shivamogga complies with the requirements of ISO 9001:2015.

2. This certificate is valid concerning all activities related to educational services offering four-year B.E programmes in Civil Engg, CSE, EEE, ECE, ISE and ME and 2 year MBA programme in specializations such as marketing, finance and human resources.

Courses offered
UG Programs
 Computer Science & Engineering
 Electronics & Communications Engineering
 Information Science & Engineering
 Electrical & Electronics Engineering
 Mechanical Engineering
 Civil engineering

PG programs
 M.Tech in Computer Science and Engineering
 M.Tech in Digital Electronics
 Master of Business Administration

Recent activities
 'Prerana' 2015. The bi-annual cultural fest was held on May 8 & 9. With ten pre-fest events, and 15 fest events.
 'Android Hackathon' workshop conducted from 13–15 February 2015.
 Department of Computer Science & Engineering, PESITM conducted International Conference on Information and Communication Technologies (ICICT-2014) on 5 and 6 May 2014.
 PESITM conducted Annual Cultural Fest Prerana - 2014 in the month of April, 2014
 Google Android app development workshop was conducted by Dept. of Computer Science in association with Google Development Group (GDG) of Mangalore 14 and 15 March 2014.
 A two-day WorkShop on "Getting started with Unity3D for Windows 8″ was conducted at PESITM College on 16 and 17 March by "Student Nokia Developers Group of PESITM".
 PESITM in association with Microsoft conducted 24-hour App Fest Hackaton on 29 and 30 September 2013.
 Department of CSE conducted three- day Mobile Innovation Workshop in association with Nokia.

References

External links

Affiliates of Visvesvaraya Technological University
Engineering colleges in Karnataka
Education in Shimoga
Universities and colleges in Shimoga district
Educational institutions established in 2007
2007 establishments in Karnataka